J. Edward Donnelly (February 20, 1908 – March 13, 1999) was an American football coach and college athletics administrator.  He served as the head football coach at the University of Vermont from 1952 to 1961.  He was also the athletic director as Vermont from 1952 to 1973.  Donnelly played college football and college basketball at the University of Chattanooga—now known as the University of Tennessee at Chattanooga.

Head coaching record

References

1908 births
1999 deaths
Boston University Terriers football coaches
Chattanooga Mocs football players
Chattanooga Mocs men's basketball players
Columbia Lions football coaches
Vermont Catamounts athletic directors
Vermont Catamounts football coaches
American men's basketball players
People from Norwich, Connecticut